A-kinase anchor protein 13 is a protein that in humans is encoded by the AKAP13 gene. This protein is also called AKAP-Lbc because it encodes the lymphocyte blast crisis (Lbc) oncogene, and ARHGEF13/RhoGEF13 because it contains a guanine nucleotide exchange factor (GEF) domain for the RhoA small GTP-binding protein.

Function 
A-kinase anchor protein 13/Rho guanine nucleotide exchange factor 13 is guanine nucleotide exchange factor (GEF) for the RhoA small GTPase protein. Rho is a small GTPase protein that is inactive when bound to the guanine nucleotide GDP. But when acted on by Rho GEF proteins such as AKAP13, this GDP is released and replaced by GTP, leading to the active state of Rho. In this active, GTP-bound conformation, Rho can bind to and activate specific effector proteins and enzymes to regulate cellular functions. In particular, active Rho is a major regulator of the cell actin cytoskeleton.

AKAP13 is a member of a group of four RhoGEF proteins known to be activated by G protein coupled receptors coupled to the  G12 and G13 heterotrimeric G proteins. The others are ARHGEF1 (also known as p115-RhoGEF), ARHGEF11 (also known as PDZ-RhoGEF), and ARHGEF12 (also known as LARG).  GPCR-regulated AKAP13 (and these related GEF proteins) acts as an effector for G12 and G13 G proteins. Unlike the other three members, AKAP13 does not function as RGS family GTPase-activating proteins (GAPs) to increase the rate of GTP hydrolysis of G12/G13 alpha proteins.

The A-kinase anchor proteins (AKAPs) are a group of structurally diverse proteins that have the common function of binding to the regulatory subunit of protein kinase A (PKA), thus confining the holoenzyme to discrete locations within the cell. The AKAP13 gene encodes a member of the AKAP family since the protein binds tightly to PKA, especially in the heart.

Alternative splicing of this gene results in at least 3 transcript variants encoding different isoforms. All three contain the Dbl oncogene homology (DH) domain plus Pleckstrin homology (PH) domain (DH/PH domain) characteristic of Rho family GEFs, while only the longer two isoforms also contain the AKAP domain. Therefore, these isoforms may function as scaffolding proteins to coordinate Rho signaling and protein kinase A signaling.

Interactions 
AKAP13 has been shown to interact with:
 CTNNAL1
 Estrogen receptor alpha 
 GNA12
 GNA13
 PRKAR2A

See also 
 Second messenger system
 G protein-coupled receptor
 Heterotrimeric G protein
 Small GTPases
 Rho family of GTPases
 Protein kinase A

References

External links

Further reading 

 
 
 
 
 
 
 
 
 
 
 

A-kinase-anchoring proteins